The O.C. Lewis Gymnasium is a 3000-seat multi-purpose arena in Anderson, Indiana, USA on the Anderson University campus. It hosts local sporting events and gymkhana.  It was home to the Indiana Alley Cats, in 2005, and the Anderson University Ravens basketball teams.  The arena opened in 1962.

American Basketball Association (2000–present) venues
Anderson Ravens and Lady Ravens
Basketball venues in Indiana
Indoor arenas in Indiana
Buildings and structures in Anderson, Indiana
1962 establishments in Indiana
Sports venues completed in 1962